Daniel Sjölin (born 1977 in Bålsta, Håbo Municipality), is a Swedish novelist and television presenter.

Bibliography
 Oron bror 2002
 Personliga pronomen 2004
 Världens sista roman 2007

References

Swedish male novelists
Swedish television hosts
1977 births
Living people
21st-century Swedish novelists
21st-century male writers
People from Håbo Municipality